The Special Operations Forces of the Armed Forces of the Russian Federation, commonly known as the Special Operations Forces (SOF), are strategic-level special forces under the Special Operations Forces Command of the General Staff of the Armed Forces of the Russian Federation. It is also a structural and an independent unit of the Armed Forces.

The first units of what would become the Special Operations Forces were transferred from the GRU in 2009 as part of the continuing 2008 Russian military reform. The Special Operations Forces Command was established in 2012 and announced in March 2013 by the Chief of the General Staff Valery Gerasimov. According to Gerasimov, the SOF was designed as a strategic-level asset, elite special operations force units of the KSSO whose primary missions would be foreign interventions including counter-proliferation, foreign internal defense operations and undertaking the most complex special operations and clandestine missions for protecting interests of the Russian Federation.

SOF are distinct from the Spetsnaz GRU that until 2010 were under the Main Intelligence Directorate and whose subsequent subordination was left unclear until 2013 where the decision was reversed and GRU special forces units were reassigned to GRU divisions and placed under GRU authority again. Russia's SOF are manned exclusively by professional personnel hired on contract, of which all are full-time servicemen consisting of commissioned officers and regular soldiers.

On 26 February 2015, President Vladimir Putin decreed that 27 February be the Day of the SOF, according to multiple Russian official news agencies (albeit not acknowledged formally), to mark the establishment of Russian control over the building of the Supreme Council of the Autonomous Republic of Crimea in Simferopol, Crimea on 27 February 2014.

Mission and methods

The Special Operations Forces are a highly mobile, well-trained and equipped, constant combat prepared special operations force of the Russian Ministry of Defense. Designed for performing specific tasks, the SOF have the ability to function both within the country and abroad, in peacetime and in wartime (with application of military force, by necessity).

The Russian Ministry of Defense defines the term "special operation" as "methods and ways of fighting not characteristic of conventional forces: reconnaissance and sabotage, subversion and sedition, counter-terrorism, counter-sabotage, counterintelligence, guerrilla, counter-guerrilla and other activities".

The SOF have been primarily involved in Syria, conducting target acquisition for Russian Air Force combat planes conducting airstrikes and Russian Navy sea-launched cruise missile strikes, serving as military advisors training Syrian government troops, seek and destroying critical enemy objects, disruption behind enemy lines through ambushes, high value targeted assassinations and retaliation strikes against select groups of fighters.

History

Within the Russian Federation
In 2009, as a part of the comprehensive reform of the Russian Federation's Armed Forces, Special Operations Directorate, subordinate directly to the Chief of the General Staff, was created on the basis of the GRU's 322nd Specialist Training Center in the Moscow region (Military Unit 92154). The unit saw extensive action in the Caucasus region and earned the nickname podsolnukhi (sunflowers), a nickname given to the soldiers assigned to the unit while serving in Chechnya. It was reported that Colonel Oleg Martianov, who later became a member of the board of the Military-Industrial Commission, was one of the founders and first commander of the SOF from 2009 to 2013.

In 2012, the Special Operations Directorate was reorganized as Special Operations Command, which was followed by plans to upscale the Forces manpower up to 9 special purpose brigades.

On 6 March 2013, General Valery Gerasimov announced the creation of the Special Operations Forces. While speaking to foreign military attaches in Moscow, he said: "After reviewing the practice of the formation, training and the use of special operations forces in the leading countries of the world, Russia's Defense Ministry has also begun to create them... A corresponding command was created, which is engaged in planning work and implements plan of training of the Armed Forces... A set of documents has already been elaborated to determine the direction of development, methods of training and application of these forces".

On 15 March 2013, according to Russian media reports, creation of the Special Operations Center of the Ministry of Defense for around 500 professional soldiers began in the suburban village of Kubinka-2. Formation of the Center was scheduled to be completed by the end of 2013. The center would be directly subordinate to the Special Operations Forces Command of the Russian Ministry of Defense.

At the end of April 2013, units of the Special Operations Forces conducted a special tactics exercise at Elbrus mountains at an altitude of 4,500 meters. The exercise was dedicated to practice transportation of one of the SOF units by military transport aviation and army aviation, as well as air insertion of personnel and cargo into target area.

During peacetime, the SOF may also be called in to execute certain specialised homeland security operations. In May 2013, the General Staff said that the unit would be tasked with security of the 2014 Winter Olympic Games in Sochi and that the SOF now comprised air and naval components. Again, when Russia hosted the 2018 FIFA World Cup, the SOF and FSB special forces units took charge of ensuring the security.

The SOF also conducted counter-terrorism and special operations during the insurgency in the North Caucasus region disguised as other Spetsnaz units.

On 2 December 2017, an unnamed mountain with a height of 3,939 meters located on the Sudor ridge in the Irafsky District of the Republic of North Ossetia-Alania, was named "Mountain of Special Operations Forces".

Outside the Russian Federation
The SOF has also taken part in anti-piracy operations in the Gulf of Aden, clashing with Somali pirates. 

In late February 2014, an unknown number of SOF operators alongside other Russian troops entered Crimea disguised as "little green men" and captured the Crimean Parliament and also began the blockading and capturing of other significant and strategic sites across the peninsula.

SOF combat operations in Syria, which began covertly in late 2015 became more visible by January 2016 with the successful Latakia offensive. They played a crucial role in the Palmyra offensive, provided support to the Syrian Army attempting the recapturing of Raqqa, repelling the ISIL offensive on Palmyra and throughout the Syrian push for Aleppo in the same year. 

They returned during the Second battle of Palmyra in 2017 and saw action throughout the year in the Eastern Homs offensive, North Hama offensive, Operation Grand Dawn, the East Hama offensive, Operation Khuzam, rescuing a Russian Military Police unit in the Idlib de-escalation zone and the entirety of the Eastern Syria campaign. The SOF also contributed to the success of the Rif Dimashq Governorate campaign in 2018 and Operation Dawn of Idlib in 2019.

On 11 December 2017, SOF units provided top-level security for the unannounced visit of Russian President Vladimir Putin to Syria at Khmeimim Air Base by covering the most dangerous directions from sea, air and land. Vladimir Putin and Defence Minister Sergey Shoygu later personally thanked all the military personnel involved for their exemplary performance of the task.

In February 2022, the SOF was involved in the full-scale invasion of Ukraine, conducting covert operations targeting critical military infrastructure and support systems of Ukraine and reconnaissance missions behind enemy lines.

Structure and organization 
While official numbers are classified, between the Special Purpose Center "Senezh" and the headquarters at the Special Purpose Center "Kubinka-2", analysts believe the size is around 2,000 to 2,500 total personnel. The command has supporting elements providing combat support and combat service support functions. There is a dedicated special aviation brigade that directly controls combat aviation assets at Torzhok, and a squadron of Ilyushin Il-76 transport aircraft at the Migalovo airfield near Tver.

The Special Operations Forces Command is similar in role to the U.S. Joint Special Operations Command and the German Kommando Spezialkräfte. The command reached full operational capability later in 2013 and also serves as the central command authority for the entire SOF structure of which is subordinate directly to the General Staff.

Training

The training of the officer recruit special operators is carried out in the Ryazan Guards Higher Airborne Command School – RVVDKU (department of special and military intelligence and the department of the use of special forces) and the Novosibirsk Higher Military Command School – NVVKU (department of special intelligence and the chair of the special reconnaissance and airborne training). At "Senezh", potential operators learn skydiving, mountaineering, swimming and military diving, and storming buildings and homes, while "Kubinka-2" focuses on maritime operations and reconnaissance and controls several naval special operations detachments.

There is a cold weather/mountaineering training centre at Mount Elbrus codenamed "Terskol", in Kabardino-Balkaria and the 54th Special Reconnaissance Center in Vladikavkaz, North Ossetia–Alania. Several more sensitive centers specialised for training SOF specialists also exist in military secrecy. Depending on the individual tasks the operatives are being prepared for or specialise in, the training varies.

The Special Operations Forces warfare training centers and facilities:
 Special Operations Center "Kubinka-2" 
 Special Operations Center "Senezh"
 Specialist Training Center
 561st Naval Rescue (Training) Center of VMF
 344th Army Aviation Training & Transition Center
 Mountain & Survival Training Center "Terskol"
 54th Special Reconnaissance Training Center "Daryal"

Known operations
 In 2014, unidentified armed men began blockading Ukrainian bases in Crimea, and on 27 February, they seized the Crimean parliament. While claiming to be a local militia, this well-armed and highly professional unit turned out to be the first deployment of Russia's special operators. On 18 March, undercover operatives captured another military base in Simferopol. According to Russian sources, SOF commander Major General Alexey Dyumin, personally conducted operations in Crimea. Colonel Alexander Popov served as a detachment commander of the SOF and was directly involved in the events for which he was awarded the honorary title of Hero of the Russian Federation.

 SOF have been tasked in recovering the flight recorder of Russia's downed Su-24M back in November 2015, on the same day rescuing the surviving crew of one of the two Mi-8AMTsh helicopters downed by Syrian Turkmen Brigade militants in a CSAR operation which had been searching for the crew of the Su-24.

 During the Battle of Palmyra in March 2016, Senior Lieutenant Alexander Prokhorenko was killed after he ordered an airstrike on his location after being surrounded by ISIL fighters and out of ammunition. He was posthumously awarded the honorary title of Hero of the Russian Federation for the heroic feat.

 On 10 May 2017, Russian President Vladimir Putin personally awarded medals to four officers of the SOF for showing extraordinary courage combating terrorists in Syria. They were part of a 16-man special forces detachment unit which managed to successfully repulse attacks conducted by over 300 jihadists without any losses. The commander of the unit, Lieutenant Colonel Danila was awarded the honorary title of Hero of the Russian Federation.

 On 16 August 2017, a 4-5 man SOF unit was ambushed by 40 Islamic State terrorists in the town of Akerbat and being abandoned by Syrian soldiers. After all the other members of his unit were injured, including the commander and the second officer, Lance corporal Denis Portnyagin took upon the whole job himself and killed 14 terrorists in the process and was even ready to blow his grenades to prevent their capture. He was awarded the honorary title of Hero of the Russian Federation for this feat.

 On 20 September 2017, the Russian General Staff said jihadist militants tried to capture a 29-man unit of the Russian military police two days before, whom were monitoring the ceasefire in a de-escalation zone in Idlib. The trapped unit fought for several hours and were eventually rescued in a special operation by a joint task force which comprised the Syrian and Russian Air Force alongside the SOF. Three SOF operatives were injured. All 29 men withdrew safely without any fatalities. Hundreds of jihadists were killed in retaliatory airstrikes by 21 September.

 On 26 September 2017, the Russian Defense Ministry announced Russia had conducted massive cruise missile strikes in Deir ez-Zor and Idlib destroying significant ISIS and Al-Nusra Front targets. On 27 September 2017, 5 Al-Nusra field commanders were killed in an airstrike alongside 32 militants in Idlib province. Another airstrike on 3 October 2017, killed 12 Al-Nusra field commanders including Ahmad al-Ghizai, Al-Nusra's security service chief and at least 50 militants in an undisclosed location in Syria. The Defense Ministry cited the use of "special measures" in those targeted strikes on militant positions, indicating the involvement of Russian special forces in the operations.

 On 12 January 2018, the Russian Defense Ministry announced that the group of militants responsible for a massive mortar attack targeting the Khmeimim Air Base in Syria on 31 December 2017 which killed two Russian soldiers were liquidated in the course of a special operation. SOF operatives tracked the militants to their base camp near the border of Idlib and destroyed the entire group with a Krasnopol projectile as they were boarding a minibus to leave the base. No mentions were made of which group the militants were affiliated to. Separately, a depot storing militant drones located in Idlib province was destroyed as well.

 On 25 March 2019, the Russian Defense Ministry said that a group of more than 30 terrorists were eliminated in a special operation by the SOF and the Russian Air Force after they were identified. The operation was a retaliation for the terrorist attack in late February 2019 which killed 3 Russian servicemen. The location and affiliation of the terrorists were undisclosed.

 During Operation Dawn of Idlib, SOF were suspected to be responsible for multiple successful raids behind enemy lines especially in Idlib province killing scores of rebel fighters including two prominent commanders from Ahrar al-Sham and Jaysh al-Nasr. Others killed were from Suqour Al-Sham, Hurras Al-Din and other various rebel factions.

 On 25 August 2020, the Russian Defense Ministry said the Russian and Syrian aviation with the support of artillery and the SOF carried out a joint operation which killed 327 militants and destroyed 134 shelters, 17 observation posts, 7 ammunition warehouses and 5 underground storage facilities of ISIS from 18 to 24 August across the Syrian Desert. The operation was in response to an IED explosion which killed Major General Vyacheslav Gladkikh and wounded 3 Russian soldiers near Deir ez-Zor back on 18 August.

Casualties
According to the Russian Defence Ministry as of February 2019, there are ten cases among SOF personnel in Syria that have been confirmed to be killed in action. Four members whose status are presumed to have been killed still remains unclear as of September 2019.

Hero of the Russian Federation recipients
Col. 
Col. 
Col. 
Lt. Col. 
Maj. 
LCpl.

Commanders

Weapons

Handguns
 APS
PYa
Glock 17
SPP-1 underwater pistol
 PB
 PSS silent pistol
 PSM pistol
 Makarov

Submachine guns
 Vityaz
MP5

Assault rifles
 AS Val
AK-74M
AN-94
 AK-105
 AK-103
 AK-104
 AKS-74U
 AK-12 
 V-AR  (during trainings or competitions)

Sniper rifles
 VSS Vintorez
 Orsis T-5000
 SV-98
Dragunov SVD
 OSV-96
 ASVK-M Kord-M
 Steyr SSG 08
 Steyr SSG 04

Machine guns
 PKM
Pecheneg
 RPK-16

Explosive weapons
GP-34
 GM-94
RShG-2
 RPG-27
 RPO PDM-A
 9K111 "Fagot"
 MON-50
 RGO
 RGN

Equipment

Apparel
 Arcteryx LEAF kit
 Special Operations Forces kit for extremely hot climates
 Propper Multicam BDU
 Tactical Performance ATACS FG Tactical Field Jacket/Tactical Combat Pants
 Tactical Performance ATACS FG Battle Strike Uniform Coat/Trousers
 Tactical Performance Multicam Tactical Field Jacket/Tactical Combat Pants
 Tactical Performance Multicam Battle Strike Uniform Coat/Trousers
 Tactical Performance Multicam Tactical Combat Shirt
 Phantom special thermal underwear
 Ratnik VKBO EMR camouflage combat uniforms
 Arctic raid suit "Nanuk," other special equipment for low temperatures

Helmets
 6B7-1M
 Voin-Kiver RSP
 LSHZ 1+
 6B47
 5,45 Design Spartan 1
 5,45 Design Spartan 2
 5,45 Design Spartan 3

Vests
 6Sh112 LBV
 6Sh117 LBV
 6B43 armor vest
 6B45 
 6B46 
 "Redut-M" armour vest
 STICH PROFI® Loading system plate carrier
 STICH PROFI® Lightweight plate carrier
 FORT Defender 2
 5.11 Tactec Plate Carrier
 ARS ARMA Tactec Plate Carrier
 Raidgear&MBC "Phantom" universal Plate Carrier
 Raidgear&MBC MBSVest Type 2 and 3 Molle Minus universal bodyarmor
 Various Crye Precision, Survival corps, SSO/SPSON, Gear Craft, Wartech, FORT, ANA tactical, ARSARMA, Armocom plate carriers
 FORT Gladiator-A Plate Carrier

Other
 FORT OVR-3SH Combat Engineering/Demining Kit
 FORT Fortres K14 protective suit
 FORT Raid-L protective suit
 PMK gas mask
 GKN-7 diving suit
 Aqualung Amphora rebreather
 Veer-6 ballistic shield
 PT-2 thermal monocular
 Peltor Com Tac XP headset
 NRS-2 special scout knife
ZALA UAVs
 Strelets reconnaissance, control and communications system
 Arbalet parachute system

Transport vehicles

Ground vehicles
 Yamaha Grizzly 700 ATV
 Iveco LMV "Rys"
 GAZ-2330 "Tigr"
 Toyota Hilux
 Land Rover Defender 110

Aircraft
 Mi-8MTV-5 transport helicopter
 Mi-8AMTSh armed assault helicopter
 An-26 transport aircraft

Watercraft
 BRP SEA-DOO GTX LTD PWC
 BRP SEA-DOO RTX-215 PWC
  RBS BlackShadow DPVs (Diver Propulsion Vehicles)

Gallery

See also

 Special Forces of the Main Directorate of the General Staff of the Russian Armed Forces
 Foreign Intelligence Service's 
 Joint Special Operations Command (JSOC) – U.S. equivalent command

References

Military units and formations established in 2009
Military units and formations established in 2013
Military units and formations of the Russo-Ukrainian War
Special Operations Forces
Special forces units and formations
Special Operations Forces
Counterterrorist organizations